Marge and Jeff is an early American sitcom broadcast Monday through Friday on the DuMont Television Network during the 1953-1954 television season.

Broadcast history
The program originated as Marge and Fred on a station in Philadelphia. The title was changed when a new male co-star came on the show.

The main claim to fame of this series is the fact that, unlike many other American sitcoms of the 1950s, it appeared every weekday at 7:15 pm ET, after Captain Video and His Video Rangers during its original run. The show starred and was written by Marge Greene. Each episode was 15 minutes long.

The series, at one point, received a Neilson rating of 13.6.

Format
The series was largely set in the living room and kitchen of characters Marge and Jeff, who were often accompanied by their dog Paisley. Costing just $5,000 a week to produce and aired on 40 stations, the series used a mix of rehearsed and ad-lib dialogue, based on a scenario written by Marge Greene. It was originally a local Philadelphia-aired series titled Marge and Fred.

Episode status
At least 27 episodes exist at the UCLA Film and Television Archive, and four at the Paley Center for Media. UCLA records show that the show probably never had a commercial sponsor and instead featured public service announcements.

Some of the existing episodes survived because it directly followed Captain Video which was regularly kinescoped, with Marge and Jeff apparently preserved on the same 30-minute reel of film.

UCLA records indicate that several episodes were repeated in July 1954. For example, the September 28, 1953, episode was repeated on July 20, 1954. This indicates that DuMont was retaining at least some of the episodes after broadcast. This is noteworthy because DuMont's archive was destroyed by a successor company after the network ceased broadcasting, and there has been speculation as to which shows DuMont had considered worth keeping.

See also
List of programs broadcast by the DuMont Television Network
List of surviving DuMont Television Network broadcasts
1953-54 United States network television schedule
Mack & Myer for Hire (another "daily" sitcom)
The Trouble with Tracy (another "daily" sitcom)
I Married Joan (similar 1950s sitcom)

Bibliography
David Weinstein, The Forgotten Network: DuMont and the Birth of American Television (Philadelphia: Temple University Press, 2004) 
Alex McNeil, Total Television, Fourth edition (New York: Penguin Books, 1980) 
Tim Brooks and Earle Marsh, The Complete Directory to Prime Time Network TV Shows, Third edition (New York: Ballantine Books, 1964)

References

External links

Marge and Jeff at CTVA
List of surviving Marge and Jeff episodes
DuMont historical website

1953 American television series debuts
1954 American television series endings
1950s American sitcoms
DuMont Television Network original programming
Black-and-white American television shows
English-language television shows
American live television series